Slaviša Jeremić (born 15 February 1983) is a Serbian football midfielder who plays for FK Zemun.

References

External links
 
 Slaviša Jeremić stats at utakmica.rs

1983 births
Living people
Footballers from Belgrade
Association football midfielders
Serbian footballers
FK Obilić players
FK Mladost Lučani players
FK Radnički Beograd players
FK Voždovac players
FK Bežanija players
FK Rad players
FK Metalac Gornji Milanovac players
FK Borac Čačak players
FK Jedinstvo Užice players
FK Zemun players
Serbian SuperLiga players
Serbian expatriate footballers
Serbian expatriate sportspeople in Romania
CSM Ceahlăul Piatra Neamț players
Serbian expatriate sportspeople in North Macedonia
Expatriate footballers in North Macedonia
FK Rabotnički players